Stephen Obayan Sunday (born 17 September 1988), nicknamed Sunny, is a Nigerian professional footballer who plays as a defensive midfielder.

Club career

Early years
Born in Lagos, Sunny began his career in Nigeria with Ebedei and Jegede Babes. In 2003, he participated in two youth championships in Sweden and Spain: in the latter he appeared in Madrid's third edition of the Annual Immigrants World Cup, where he impressed so much he was given a five-year-contract with Polideportivo Ejido, in the Segunda División.

Valencia
Sunny became a regular player for the Andalusia team, making 65 competitive appearances during his two-year spell and signing for Valencia in the summer, but after one season where he was scarcely used, he was loaned to fellow La Liga club Osasuna. In late January 2009, he was linked with a move to England's Portsmouth, but the deal eventually collapsed due to financial complications.

On 30 June 2009, after a season which was marred by injury, Sunny was loaned to Betis for one year with a view to a permanent four-year move. He also appeared rarely during the second-tier campaign, as the Verdiblancos failed to return to the top flight (seven matches out of 42).

In July 2010, Sunny had a trial in England with newly promoted Premier League side Blackpool, playing in a pre-season friendly against Crewe Alexandra on 27 July and four days later against Bristol City, but nothing came of it.

Numancia
Sunny spent the first months of the new season training on his own, having been deemed surplus to requirements by Valencia manager Unai Emery. On 19 January 2011 he was again loaned, moving to Numancia from division two.

In the following two years, still in that tier and already as a permanent signing, Sunny was first-choice for the Sorians. On 11 May 2011 he scored his first goal as a senior, netting the 2–1 winner away against Albacete.

Bnei Sakhnin / CSKA Sofia
On 30 July 2013, Sunny signed a two-year contract with Israeli club Bnei Sakhnin. On 3 January of the following year, he moved teams and countries again, joining Bulgaria's CSKA Sofia after agreeing to a two-and-a-half-year deal.

Real Salt Lake
After starting out the season in Turkey with Alanyaspor, Sunny joined Real Salt Lake on 21 January 2016. He scored his first Major League Soccer goal on 12 March, helping to a 2–1 home defeat of Seattle Sounders.

Sunny was released following the 2018 campaign.

Pafos
In July 2019, Sunny signed for Cypriot First Division club Pafos.

International career

Sunday, who was born in Nigeria, was eligible to play for Spain under FIFA rules allowing players with dual nationality and without full international caps to switch allegiance before the age of 21. After first appearing for the under-19 side, he was called up by his adopted nation to the 2007 FIFA U-20 World Cup in Canada, playing four games as the team exited in the quarter-finals.

In September 2010, Sunny was called up for Nigeria's 2012 Africa Cup of Nations qualifier in Guinea scheduled for the following month. He made his debut in that game as a starter, in a 1–0 loss in Conakry.

Honours
Valencia
Copa del Rey: 2007–08

References

External links

1988 births
Living people
Spanish people of Nigerian descent
Nigerian emigrants to Spain
Naturalised citizens of Spain
Spanish sportspeople of African descent
Sportspeople of Nigerian descent
Sportspeople from Lagos
Nigerian footballers
Spanish footballers
Association football midfielders
La Liga players
Segunda División players
Polideportivo Ejido footballers
Valencia CF players
CA Osasuna players
Real Betis players
CD Numancia players
Israeli Premier League players
Bnei Sakhnin F.C. players
First Professional Football League (Bulgaria) players
PFC CSKA Sofia players
TFF First League players
Alanyaspor footballers
Major League Soccer players
USL Championship players
Real Salt Lake players
Real Monarchs players
Cypriot First Division players
Pafos FC players
Spain youth international footballers
Spain under-21 international footballers
Nigeria international footballers
Nigerian expatriate footballers
Expatriate footballers in Spain
Expatriate footballers in Israel
Expatriate footballers in Bulgaria
Expatriate footballers in Turkey
Expatriate soccer players in the United States
Expatriate footballers in Cyprus
Nigerian expatriate sportspeople in Spain
Nigerian expatriate sportspeople in Israel
Nigerian expatriate sportspeople in Bulgaria
Nigerian expatriate sportspeople in Turkey
Nigerian expatriate sportspeople in the United States
Nigerian expatriate sportspeople in Cyprus